Jun Woong-sun (born 14 June 1986) is a professional South Korean tennis player.

Jun reached his highest individual ranking on the ATP Tour on May 26, 2008, when he became World number 230.  He plays primarily on the Futures circuit and the Challenger circuit.

Jun has been a member of the South Korean Davis Cup team, posting a 9–5 record in singles and a 3–3 record in doubles in twelve ties played.

Tour singles titles – all levels (2–2)

External links

1986 births
Living people
South Korean male tennis players
Tennis players at the 2006 Asian Games
Asian Games medalists in tennis
Asian Games gold medalists for South Korea
Asian Games bronze medalists for South Korea
Medalists at the 2006 Asian Games
21st-century South Korean people